Giovanni Scampini (born 8 November 1991) is an Italian professional footballer who plays as a midfielder for Italian club Massese.

Club career

Early career 
Born in Busto Arsizio, Scampini started playing football with local team Pro Patria, before joining Milan at the start of the 2003–04 season. He spent seven years in the club's youth system and was a member of the under-20 side who triumphed in the Coppa Italia Primavera in 2010, 25 years after their last success.

Pisa 
For the 2010–11 season, Scampini was sent out on loan to Prima Divisione side Pisa. He made his official debut for the club in the first game of the Coppa Italia Lega Pro group stage against Sangiovannese — which Pisa won 2–1 — on 15 August 2010. The next week, he also made his league debut, in the first match of the season against Nocerina.

Poggibonsi 
Scampini was signed on another loan deal by Seconda Divisione club Poggibonsi, on 31 January 2011.

Massese 
On 7 August 2021, Scampini joined Massese.

References

External links 
 Profile at Assocalciatori.it
 

Living people
1991 births
People from Busto Arsizio
Association football midfielders
Italian footballers
Serie C players
Serie D players
Aurora Pro Patria 1919 players
A.C. Milan players
Pisa S.C. players
U.S. Poggibonsi players
F.C. Pavia players
U.S.D. Sestri Levante 1919 players
A.C. Legnano players
U.S. 1913 Seregno Calcio players
A.S.D. Città di Varese players
Milano City F.C. players
U.S. Massese 1919 players
Sportspeople from the Province of Varese
Footballers from Lombardy